Outlaws and Angels is a 2016 American Western film directed by JT Mollner and starring Chad Michael Murray, Francesca Eastwood, Teri Polo, Frances Fisher and Luke Wilson.

Summary
A gang of bank robbers fleeing to Mexico invade the home of a frontier family, which unexpectedly turns into a suspenseful night of seduction, turning tables, and revenge.

Plot
In Cuchillo, New Mexico, 1887, a group of five outlaws, led by Henry, are robbing the town bank, which culminates in a shoot-out with the residents of the town. A posse of bounty hunters, led by Josiah, is formed and are in hot pursuit, “only being a half-day behind them".

The outlaws are now down to four after one of the men was shot dead after the robbery. They are met on the path by a couple, who are the aunt and uncle of Charlie, and brought them supplies. They find out that there is a bounty of 8000 dollars on their heads. They shoot the couple so they cannot turn them in for the reward money.

The posse comes upon the scene of the dead couple, and Josiah talks to the couples' granddaughter Lulu, who hid in the bushes when her grandparents were shot. She tells them that they are headed East through White Sands, to make them more difficult to track.

The outlaws are down to three, when one passes out and they shoot him to put him out of his misery. They spot the Tildon farm, where Preacher George and Ada live with their teenage daughters, Charlotte and Florence, and make plan to descend on them at dark.

They burst in to the house, and start eating and drinking whiskey and intend to have relations with the women. Florence catches Henry's eye and he calls her to sit on his lap. Ada and George plead with the men because she is only 15, but both are brutally subdued by Charlie and Little Joe. George says he is the preacher of the chapel on the property, but nobody attends now because the town was ravaged by consumption.

Henry orders Little Joe to keep watch outside and take Charlotte with him. Henry wants a massage from Florence and they go into the bedroom. He is put off when she tries to perform oral sex on him, saying she is an "adventuress". He says he wants to have relations with her, but wants it done the proper way. Little Joe's advances are rebuffed when he tries to talk with Charlotte, who is disgusted with him. Charlie sexually assaults Ada while her husband sleeps next to her on the floor.

Florence becomes enamored by Henry and plans to elope with him, to the dismay of her family. Florence pulls a gun on George, but Henry stops her from shooting him. She shoots and kills Charlotte.

Henry asks George why Charlotte could not bear children. He lies and says it was because of the fever, but then confesses that he got Charlotte pregnant when she was 11 when he was "sick with devil's seed" and that a botched abortion was the cause of Charlotte not being able to have kids. George says he stopped a long time ago, but Henry knows he's lying and that he has continued to have relations with his daughters on a weekly basis.

Henry orders Little Joe to anally rape George, but calls him off, saying that he just wanted to scare him. Florence comes back in and uses a shot gun to beat George to death so he can feel the pain instead of a quick death. When asked why she killed Charlotte, she says it was because she enjoyed what went on with George. Florence spares Ada and leaves a bag of gold coins and the group leaves. Josiah gets to the farm and finds Ada sitting on the stairs of the chapel, apparently in a catatonic state. He steals the bag of coins, but Ada shoots him to death as he walks away.

The group makes it to Mexico and Florence shoots all three men. Charlie dies instantly, but Little Joe is still standing when Henry shoots him to keep him from shooting at Florence. Florence apologizes to Henry, saying she really wanted to go with him, but the reward money was too good to pass up. Henry shoots himself in the head and dies. Florence chops their heads off with an ax and bags them to turn in for the bounty. Back at the farm, Florence shoots Ada.

Cast 
 Chad Michael Murray as Henry
 Francesca Eastwood as Florence Tildon
 Teri Polo as Ada Tildon
 Frances Fisher as Esther
 Luce Rains as Augustus
 Luke Wilson as Josiah
 Steven Michael Quezada as Alonzo
 Ben Browder as George Tildon
 Madisen Beaty as Charlotte Tildon
 Keith Loneker as Little Joe
 Nathan Russell as Charlie
 Connor Paolo as Connor
 Lela Rose Allen as Lulu

Reception
The movie was an official selection of the Sundance Film Festival. Dennis Harvey of Variety reviewed the film, placing it on the magazine's "21 Best films of Sundance" list for 2016. Justin Lowe of The Hollywood Reporter wrote that it "conveys ample shock value, but comes up short thematically".

See also
List of films featuring home invasions

References

External links
 
 
 

2016 films
2016 Western (genre) films
American Western (genre) films
2010s English-language films
2010s American films
Films scored by Colin Stetson